The 2017–18 Nevada Wolf Pack women's basketball team will represent the University of Nevada, Reno during the 2017–18 NCAA Division I women's basketball season. The Wolf Pack, led by first year head coach Amanda Levens, play their home games at the Lawlor Events Center and were members of the Mountain West Conference. They finished the season 19–17, 7–11 in Mountain West play to finish in seventh place. They advanced to the championship of the Mountain West women's tournament where they lost to Boise State. They received an invite to the WBI where they defeated UC Irvine and Mountain West member Fresno State in the first round and quarterfinals before losing to Central Arkansas in the semifinals.

Roster

Schedule

|-
!colspan=9 style=| Non-conference regular season

|-
!colspan=9 style=| Mountain West regular season

|-
!colspan=9 style=| Mountain West Women's Tournament

|-
!colspan=9 style=| WBI

See also
 2017–18 Nevada Wolf Pack men's basketball team

References

Nevada
Nevada Wolf Pack women's basketball seasons
Nevada Wolf Pack
Nevada Wolf Pack
Nevada